Trematolestes is an extinct genus of temnospondyl amphibian from the Lower Keuper (Ladinian, Middle Triassic) of southern Germany. It was first named by Rainer R. Schoch in 2006 and the type species is Trematolestes hagdorni. It is the first trematosaurid represented by a nearly complete skeleton.

Below is a cladogram showing the phylogenetic position of Trematolestes, from Schoch (2006):

References

Triassic temnospondyls of Europe
Fossil taxa described in 2006
Fossils of Germany